The 2012 Copa de México de Naciones is the 1st edition of the Copa México de Naciones Sub-15 and it took in Mexico from June 18 till June 24.

The final match was between Mexico and Colombia in the Estadio Nemesio Diez, winning Mexico in the round of penalties.

Participating teams

 Mexico (host)

Results

Group stage
Tie-breaking criteria
The ranking of each team in each group was determined as follows:

a) greatest number of points obtained in all group matches;
b) goal difference in all group matches;
c) greatest number of goals scored in all group matches.

Had two or more teams been equal on the basis of the above three criteria, their rankings would have been determined as follows:

d) greatest number of points obtained in the group matches between the teams concerned;
e) goal difference resulting from the group matches between the teams concerned;
f) greater number of goals scored in all group matches between the teams concerned;
g) drawing of lots by the FIFA Organising Committee.

Group A

Group B

Semi-finals

Finals

References 

Copa
2011–12 in Mexican football
International association football competitions hosted by Mexico